John Nicholas Galleher (February 17, 1839 – December 7, 1891) was third bishop of the Episcopal Diocese of Louisiana from 1880 to 1891.

Early life and education
Galleher was born on February 17, 1839, in Washington, Kentucky, to Corbin Galleher, a merchant and inn keeper, and Elizabeth Johnson Riley. He received his early education at Maysville, Kentucky and attended the University of Virginia from 1856 and 1858. Galleher served in the Confederate army under Simon Bolivar Buckner. After the war he commenced studies in Theology and practiced law in Louisville, Kentucky after which he attended the General Theological Seminary. In 1875 he earned the Doctor of Divinity from Columbia University.

Ordained ministry
Galleher was ordained a deacon on June 7, 1868, in Christ Church Cathedral in Louisville, Kentucky by Bishop George David Cummins. He served as assistant in Christ Church Louisville. On May 30, 1869, he was ordained a priest by Bishop Joseph Pere Bell Wilmer of Louisiana in Trinity Church, New Orleans after which he became rector of the same church, a post he held till 1871. Later he was appointed rector of Memorial Church in Baltimore and then rector of Zion Church in New York City.

Episcopacy
Galleher was elected Bishop of Louisiana and consecrated on February 5, 1880, by Bishop William Mercer Green of Mississippi, and co-consecrated by Richard Hooker Wilmer of Alabama, Charles Franklin Robertson of Missouri and Thomas Underwood Dudley of Kentucky. Galleher is mostly remembered as the minister who administered the last rites to Jefferson Davis. He died on December 7, 1891, in New Orleans, Louisiana.

Personal life
Galleher married Charlotte Barbee in 1868 and together had 5 children.

Publications
Perry, William Stevens: John Nicholas Galleher. In: Episcopate in America - Sketches Biographical & Bibliographical of the Bishops of the American Church. 1895, p. 262-263.

References

External links 

1839 births
1891 deaths
University of Virginia alumni
Bishops in Louisiana
General Theological Seminary alumni
19th-century American Episcopalians
Episcopal bishops of Louisiana
19th-century American clergy
Burials at Cave Hill Cemetery